Alnatham is a village in the Hosur taluk of Krishnagiri district, Tamil Nadu, India.

References 

 

Villages in Krishnagiri district